The Troubles is the seventeenth album by Irish folk and rebel band The Wolfe Tones. The album's title and songs are related to The Troubles in Northern Ireland.

Track listing 
Disc One
 This is the Day
 The Patriot Game
 The Song of Partition
 Children of Fear
 Sunday Bloody Sunday
 Plastic Bullets
 The Men Behind the Wire
 Lough Sheelin Eviction
 Go Home, British Soldiers
 Danny Boy
 Star of the County Down
 In Belfast
 Up the Border
 The Green Glens of Antrim
 The Old Orange Flute
 The Old Brigade (Dance Medley)

Disc Two
 Lament for the Lost
 We Shall Overcome
 You'll Never Beat the Irish, Part 3
 Tyrone
 Must Ireland Divided Be
 Song of Liberty
 The Orange and the Green
 Long Kesh
 The Sash My Father Wore
 Fermanagh Love Song
 Hills of Glenswilly
 Joe McDonnell
 County of Armagh
 Guildford Four
 Billy Reid
 Up the Rebels (Dance Mix)

The Wolfe Tones albums
2004 albums